Steve Kimock (born October 5, 1955) is an American rock guitarist. He was a member of San Francisco Bay Area bands Zero and KVHW. 

His tone and some of his playing approach has been compared to Jerry Garcia, who was a friend of his, and he has been affiliated with musicians connected to Grateful Dead, including the bands the Other Ones, RatDog, and Phil Lesh and Friends. Garcia cited Kimock, along with Frank Gambale and Michael Hedges, as his favorite guitar players during the later part of his life.

Early life and education
Kimock was born in Bethlehem, Pennsylvania in the Lehigh Valley region of eastern Pennsylvania on October 5, 1955. In the mid-1970s, he moved to San Francisco to play guitar with the folk-rock group the Goodman Brothers.

Career
In 1979, after working with Martin Fierro in the salsa band the Underdogs, he joined the Heart of Gold Band with Keith Godchaux, Donna Jean Godchaux, and drummer Greg Anton. Other groups that Kimock has played with include KVHW, which he formed with Bobby Vega, Ray White, and Alan Hertz, and the Steve Kimock Band, which included drummer Rodney Holmes.

In 1984, Kimock, Anton, and John Cipollina, formerly of Quicksilver Messenger Service, co-founded the instrumental psychedelic rock group Zero. When Judge Murphy joined the band in 1991, it was no longer instrumental. The album Chance in a Million had songs written by lyricist Robert Hunter of the Grateful Dead. Zero toured and recorded until 2000. Band members included Chip Roland, Melvin Seals, Liam Hanrahan, Pete Sears, Bobby Vega, Nicky Hopkins, and Vince Welnick. In March 2006, Zero reunited and toured until the death of Martin Fierro two years later. The band reunited again in 2011 for the twentieth anniversary of the Chance in a Million recording sessions. They played a benefit concert at the Great American Music Hall for Judge Murphy, who had cancer.

Kimock has toured and recorded with many Grateful Dead-themed bands, including Keith and Donna Godchaux's Heart of Gold Band (1979–80), Bob Weir's Kingfish (1986), Merl Saunders and the Rainforest Band (1990–91), Vince Welnick's Missing Man Formation (1996–97), Phil Lesh and Friends (1998–99), and The Other Ones (1998–2000). He was also a member of the Rhythm Devils in 2006, a supergroup formed by Grateful Dead drummers Bill Kreutzmann and Mickey Hart, also featuring Mike Gordon of Phish. In July 2007, Kimock was asked to fill in for a few months for Mark Karan in Bob Weir's RatDog and rejoined Ratdog in 2013.  In October 2016, Kimock was added to Bob Weir's Campfire touring band in support of Weir's 2016 solo release Blue Mountain.  He tours with his own band, Steve Kimock & Friends and occasionally Zero. He has also toured with Jorma Kaukonen and Hot Tuna throughout the past decade and is an instructor at Jorma's Fur Peace guitar camp.

In addition to those affiliations, Kimock also toured and recorded with Jerry Joseph's Little Women (1988), with Henry Kaiser and Freddy Roulette as The Psychedelic Guitar Circus (1993), and as Steve Kimock & Friends (early 1990s). In 2001, he recorded with Pete Sears on his album The Long Haul. Kimock featured on two recordings by Bruce Hornsby (Big Swing Face and Here Come the Noise Makers), and toured as featured guitarist with Hornsby and his band in 2002. Kimock was also featured along with Bobby Vega and Jimmy Sanchez in the Pete Sears written soundtrack for the film, The Fight in the Fields: Cesar Chavez and the Farmworkers' Struggle.

Steve Kimock released a solo record Last Danger of Frost (2016), and Satellite City (KIMOCK, 2017) with his son John Kimock and singer/multi-instrumentalist Leslie Mendelson.

Kimock was a member of Jazz is Dead on its 2023 tour.

Discography 
 Here Goes Nothin – Zero (1987)
 Nothin' Goes Here''' – Zero (1989)
 Go Hear Nothin – Zero (1991)
 Chance in a Million – Zero (1994)
  SK&F – Steve Kimock and Friends (1995)
 Psychedelic Guitar Circus – various artists (1996)
 Zero – Zero (1996)
 Nothin' Lasts Forever – Zero (1998)
 Live In Concert – KVHW (1998)
 The Strange Remain – The Other Ones (1999)
 Love Will See You Through – Phil Lesh and Friends (1999)
 East Meets West – Steve Kimock Band (2002)
 Live in Colorado – Steve Kimock Band (2002)
 Double Zero – Zero (2002)
 Zero Blues – Zero (2002)
 Live in Colorado, Vol. 2 – Steve Kimock Band (2004)
 Eudemonic – Steve Kimock Band (2005)
 Big Red Barn Sessions – Steve Kimock & Billy Goodman (2008)
 Last Danger of Frost – Steve Kimock (2016)
 Satellite City – KIMOCK (2017)

References

External links
Official site
Steve Kimock collection at the Internet Archive's live music archive
Steve Kimock Band collection at the Internet Archive's live music archive
Psychedelic Guitar Circus collection at Internet Archive's live music archive
Steve sits down with Ira Haberman of The Sound Podcast for a feature interview

1955 births
Living people
American rock guitarists
American male guitarists
Guitarists from Pennsylvania
People from Bethlehem, Pennsylvania
RatDog members
The Other Ones members
Kingfish (band) members
20th-century American guitarists
20th-century American male musicians
Rainforest Band members